Spencer Steele (born November 28, 1978 in Lewes, Delaware) is a former professional lacrosse player who played with the Bridgeport Barrage and New Jersey Pride of Major League Lacrosse.

Professional career
Steele was the 60th pick of the 2001 MLL Inaugural Team Draft by the Bridgeport Barrage.  He was also the 15th pick of the 2002 MLL Supplemental Draft by the New Jersey Pride.

College career
Steele attended Fairfield University where he is the most prolific scorer in Stags Lacrosse history. He ranks first in career goals (147), career shots (315), career games played (60), season goals (48), and season points (75). in 1997 Steele was the MAAC Rookie for the Year. And in 1999 he was the MAAC Player of the Year, ECAC Tournament MVP, an All-MAAC selection, an All-New England First Team Selection, and a College Lacrosse USA Pre-Season All-America Honorable Mention.

References

Major League Lacrosse players
Living people
Fairfield Stags men's lacrosse players
American lacrosse players
1978 births
People from Lewes, Delaware